Gagan Sikand is a Canadian politician who served as Member of Parliament (MP) for the Greater Toronto Area riding of Mississauga—Streetsville from 2015 to 2021. He served as a member of the Liberal Party.

Background
Sikand attended the University of Toronto. He completed an Honours B.A. with a double major in crime and deviance and philosophy with a minor in anthropology. He obtained an LLB Law degree from Brunel Law School in London, England. He worked for the provincial office of the Attorney General and Ministry of Aboriginal Affairs.  Born in Toronto, he has lived in Mississauga for over 30 years and in the riding of Mississauga-Streetsville for 29 years.

Politics
In the 2015 federal election, Sikand ran as the Liberal candidate in the riding of Mississauga—Streetsville. He defeated Conservative incumbent Brad Butt by 4,171 votes. He is a backbench supporter of the government of Prime Minister Justin Trudeau. He currently sits on the Standing Committee on Transport, Infrastructure and Communities and Standing Joint Committee on the Library of Parliament. On April 18, 2018 he was named Co-Chair of the Standing Joint Committee on the Library of Parliament.

On February 26, 2016, he introduced a Private Member's Bill that would allow police to use a device that could detect the presence of alcohol for a car driver without having to administer a breathalyzer test. As of September 21, 2016, the bill has passed first reading and is being consider by the house.

On June 13, 2016 he was named Caucus Liaison for the Ontario Young Liberals.

On October 20, 2020, Sikand took a medical leave of absence from Parliament, the leave was approved by the Chief Government Whip.

On August 15, 2021, Sikand announced that he would not be seeking re-election in the next election.

Electoral record

References

External links

1984 births
Alumni of Brunel University London
Businesspeople from Toronto
Canadian politicians of Indian descent
Canadian politicians of Punjabi descent
Lawyers in Ontario
Liberal Party of Canada MPs
Living people
Members of the House of Commons of Canada from Ontario
Ontario civil servants
Politicians from Toronto
University of Toronto alumni
21st-century Canadian politicians